The Leopoldian line was a sequence of descent in the Habsburg dynasty begun by Duke  Leopold III of Austria, who, after the death of his elder brother Rudolf IV, divided the Habsburg hereditary lands with his brother Albert III according to the 1379 Treaty of Neuberg.

History
The division of the Habsburg territories between the elder Albertinian and the younger Leopoldian line occurred after the early death of Duke Rudolf IV in 1365, when his surviving brothers Albert III and Leopold III, after several years of joint rule, divided the dynasty's dominions. The Leopoldian line received the Duchy of Styria, ruled by Austria according to the 1186 Georgenberg Pact, as well as the duchies of Carinthia and Duchy of Carniola, the County of Tyrol, and the original Habsburg estates in the former Duchy of Swabia. 

Duke Leopold had four sons; upon his death in 1386 he was initially succeeded by the eldest, William the Courteous, who ten years later had to cede Tyrol and the Swabian estates to the second-born son Leopold IV. Upon William's death in 1406, the remaining territories of Styria, Carinthia and Carniola were inherited by the third-born Ernest the Iron and became known as Inner Austria. Tyrol fell to the youngest brother, Frederick IV, called 'of the Empty Pockets'.

Only the two youngest sons of Leopold III, Ernest the Iron and Frederick IV, had issue. The children of Ernest and his wife, the Piast princess Cymburgis of Masovia, started the most famous line of the Habsburg dynasty to which most subsequent Holy Roman Emperors belonged, including their son Frederick III (V), who officially acknowledged the Austrian archducal title and by 1490 had re-unified all the dynasty's dominions. His descendants, among them Maximilian I and Charles V, ruled the Holy Roman Empire and the Austrian Habsburg monarchy in an unbroken succession until the male line became extinct with the death of Emperor Charles VI in 1740. The line of succession was continued by the last "genuine" Habsburg ruler, Maria Theresa, who became ancestress of the Imperial House of Lorraine.

Genealogy
 Leopold III (1351–1386), Duke of Austria (jointly with his brother Albert III) from 1365 to 1379, and Duke of Styria, Carinthia and Carniola (Inner Austria) from 1379 until his death
 X Viridis Visconti (1352–1414), daughter of Bernabò Visconti, Lord of Milan
 William the Courteous (c.1370–1406), Duke of Carinthia, Styria and Carniola from 1386 until his death
 X Joanna II of Naples (1373–1435), daughter of King Charles III 
 Leopold IV (1371–1411), Count of Tyrol (as Leopold II) from 1396 to 1406
 X Catherine of Burgundy (1378–1425), daughter of Duke Philip the Bold 
 Ernest the Iron (1377–1424), Duke of Carinthia, Styria and Carniola from 1406 until his death
 X (1) Margaret of Pomerania (1366–1407/10), daughter of Duke Bogislaw V
 X (2) Cymburgis of Masovia (1394/97–1429), daughter of Duke Siemowit IV
 Frederick V (1415–1493), Duke of Carinthia, Styria and Carniola from 1424, Duke of Austria from 1439, elected King of the Romans (as Frederick III) from 1440, and Holy Roman Emperor from 1452 until his death
 X Eleanor of Portugal (1434–1467), daughter of King Edward
 Maximilian I (1459–1519), elected King of the Romans from 1486, and Holy Roman Emperor from 1493 until his death→ Habsburg family tree
 Kunigunde (1465–1520)
 X Duke Albert IV of Bavaria
 Margaret (c.1416–1486)
 X Elector Frederick II of Saxony
 Albert VI (1418–1463), Duke of Styria, Carinthia and Carniola (with Frederick V) from 1424, Duke of Austria from 1457 until his death
 X Mechthild (1418–1482), daughter of Elector Palatine Louis III
 Catherine (1420–1493)
 X Margrave Charles I of Baden-Baden
 Frederick of the Empty Pockets (1382–1439), Count of Tyrol from 1406 until his death (Elder Tyrol line)
 X (1) Elizabeth (1381–1408), daughter of King Rupert of Germany 
 X (2) Anna of Brunswick (c.1390–1432), daughter of Duke Frederick I of Brunswick-Wolfenbüttel
 Sigismund (1427–1496), Count of Tyrol from 1439, resigned in 1490
 X (1) Eleanor of Scotland (1433–1480), daughter of King James I
 X (2) Catherine of Saxony (1468–1524), daughter of Duke Albert III